Gemini 11 (officially Gemini XI) was the ninth crewed spaceflight mission of NASA's Project Gemini, which flew from September 12 to 15, 1966. It was the 17th crewed American flight and the 25th spaceflight to that time (includes X-15 flights over ). Astronauts Charles "Pete" Conrad Jr. and Richard F. Gordon Jr. performed the first direct-ascent (first orbit) rendezvous with an Agena Target Vehicle, docking with it 1 hour 34 minutes after launch; used the Agena rocket engine to achieve a record high-apogee Earth orbit; and created a small amount of artificial gravity by spinning the two spacecraft connected by a tether. Gordon also performed two extra-vehicular activities for a total of 2 hours 41 minutes.

Crew

Backup crew

Support crew
Clifton C. Williams Jr. (Cape CAPCOM)
John W. Young (Houston CAPCOM)
Alan L. Bean (Houston CAPCOM)

Mission parameters
Mass: 

Highest orbit (followed twice):
Perigee: 
Apogee: 
Inclination: 28.85°
Period: 101.52 min

Docking
 Docked: September 12, 1966, 16:16:00 UTC
 Undocked: September 14, 1966, 16:55:00 UTC

Space walk
 Gordon – EVA 1
Start: September 13, 1966, 14:44:00 UTC
End: September 13, 1966, 15:17:00 UTC
Duration: 0 hours 33 minutes
 Gordon – EVA 2 (stand up)
Start: September 14, 1966, 12:49:00 UTC
End: September 14, 1966, 14:57:00 UTC
Duration: 2 hours 08 minutes

Objectives
 Perform a direct-ascent rendezvous with the Agena Target Vehicle on the first orbit in support of Project Apollo. This would simulate a Lunar Module rendezvous with the Command/Service Module after a lunar landing.
 Use the Agena rocket engine to put the combined craft in a high-apogee elliptical orbit.
 Perform two extra-vehicular activities.
 Demonstrate passive attitude stabilization of the two spacecraft connected by a tether and create artificial gravity by spinning the combined craft.
 Perform miscellaneous scientific experiments.
 Perform a computer-controlled atmospheric reentry to a precision splashdown point.

Flight

The direct-ascent rendezvous and docking with the Agena vehicle was achieved approximately 94 minutes after lift-off, depending on the on-board computer and radar equipment with only minimal assistance from ground support.

The apogee record stands as of October 2022, even though men have achieved greater distances from Earth by flying to the Moon in the Apollo program. The September 2021 SpaceX flight of Inspiration4, while having an apogee higher than most Space Shuttle flights, only reached .

The crew docked and undocked four times and still had sufficient Gemini maneuvering fuel for an unplanned fifth rendezvous.

Gordon's first EVA, planned to last for two hours, involved fastening a  tether, stored in the Agena's docking collar, to the Gemini's docking bar for the passive stabilization experiment. Gordon achieved this, but as with previous Gemini EVAs, trying to do work for an extended period proved more fatiguing than in ground simulation, and the EVA had to be terminated after only half an hour.

The passive stabilization experiment proved to be a bit troublesome. Conrad and Gordon separated the craft in a nose-down (i.e., Agena-down) position, but found that the tether would not be kept taut simply by the Earth's gravity gradient, as expected. However, they were able to generate a small amount of artificial gravity, about 0.00015 g, by firing their side thrusters to slowly rotate the combined craft like a slow-motion pair of bolas.

Gordon successfully performed a second EVA standing up with his head and shoulders out of the hatch to photograph the Earth, clouds, and stars. This was not tiring and lasted more than two hours.

Scientific experiments
The 12 scientific experiments were:
 Mass Determination: To test a technique and accuracy of a direct-contact method of determining the mass of an orbiting object, in this case the Agena Target Vehicle.
 Night Image Intensification: To test the usefulness and performance of a low-light-level television system as a supplement to unaided vision in observing surface features primarily when such features are in darkness and spacecraft pilots are not dark-adapted.
 Power Tool Evaluation: To evaluate man's capability to perform work tasks in space, including the comparison of ability to work tethered and untethered, and to evaluate the performance of the minimum-reaction power tool.
 Radiation and Zero G Effects on Blood and Neurospora: To determine whether weightlessness enhances the effects of radiation on human white blood cells and Neurospora crassa fungi.
 Synoptic Terrain Photography: To obtain high-quality photographs for research in geology, geophysics, geography, oceanography, and related fields.
 Synoptic Weather Photography: To obtain selective high-quality photographs of clouds to study the fine structure of the Earth's weather system.
 Nuclear Emulsion: To study the cosmic radiation incident on the Earth's atmosphere, to obtain detailed chemical composition of the heavy primary nuclei, and to search for rare particles.
 Airglow Horizon Photography: To measure by direct photography the heights at which atomic oxygen and sodium layers occur in the upper atmosphere.
 Ultraviolet Astronomical Camera: To test the techniques of ultraviolet photography under vacuum conditions and to obtain ultraviolet radiation observations of stars in wavelength region of 2,000 to 4,000 angstroms by spectral means.
 Ion Wake Measurement: To determine and measure the ion and electron wake structure and perturbation of the ambient medium produced by an orbiting vehicle, and to study the changes in the ion flux and wake caused by thruster firings.
 Earth-Moon Libration Region Photography: To investigate the regions of the L4 and L5 libration points of the Earth–Moon system to determine the possible existence of clouds of particulate matter orbiting the Earth in these regions.
 Dim-Light Photography and Orthicon: To obtain photographs of various faint and diffuse astronomical phenomena.

Reentry
The mission ended with the first totally automatic, computer-controlled reentry by the U.S., which brought Gemini 11 down  from its recovery ship USS Guam, only  from the planned position.

Astronaut recovery was done by Navy Helicopter Squadron HS-3.

The Gemini 11 mission was supported by 9,054 United States Department of Defense personnel, 73 aircraft, and 13 ships.

Insignia

Since Conrad and Gordon were both members of the US Navy, the embroidered mission patch was designed in Navy colors: blue and gold. Stars are used to mark the major milestones of the mission. The first orbit Agena rendezvous is marked by a small gold star just above the Earth, to the left. The Agena docking is marked by a large star on the left. The star at the top marks the record high apogee reached by Gemini 11. Finally, the star on the right marks Dick Gordon's spacewalk. The docking, record apogee and spacewalk are also shown on the patch by the Agena, orbital apogee path and spacewalking astronaut.

Potential lunar missions

Gemini 11's record altitude was ultimately the result of an internal race to the Moon. As early as 1961, NASA's Jim Chamberlin and McDonnell Aircraft had advocated using Gemini spacecraft to get to the Moon sooner than Apollo. Their proposals considered using Centaur rockets to boost the Gemini on a circumlunar trajectory (similar to the Soviet's Zond program), lunar orbit missions using Centaur rockets for translunar injection and Agena for lunar orbit insertion, and even lunar landing missions using Gemini in place of the Apollo Command Module and a small open-cockpit Langley Light LM in place of the Apollo Lunar Module. Multiple Titan or Saturn IB rockets, and even the abandoned Saturn C-3 were considered as the launch vehicles.

Pete Conrad liked these ideas and together with McDonnell corporations strongly advocated his Gemini 11 to be circumlunar. Discretely called 'Gemini - Large Earth Orbit', the plan would use a Titan IIIC-launched Transtage. The Gemini 11 crew would be launched with the Titan II GLV as they did in reality, and would dock with the Transtage, which would then boost them to translunar velocity. Conrad managed to stir Congressional interest, but NASA administrator James Webb informed them that any extra funds Congress cared to appropriate for such a project would be better spent accelerating the Apollo program. After further internal struggles, Conrad finally got NASA approval for the Agena on his Gemini 11 flight to boost him onto two record highly elliptical 1,370 km orbits. This high flight was the only remnant of lunar Gemini.

Spacecraft location

The spacecraft is on display at the California Science Center in Los Angeles, California.

See also

 Agena Target Vehicle
 Extra-vehicular activity
 List of spacewalks
 Splashdown
 Space exploration
 U.S. space exploration history on U.S. stamps
 Space capsule
 Space suit

Notes

External links

NASA Gemini 11 press kit - Sep 2, 1966

Spaceflight Mission Patches
NASA Space Science Data Coordinated Archive
U.S. Space Objects Registry

Extravehicular activity
Human spaceflights
Project Gemini missions
Spacecraft launched in 1966
Spacecraft launched by Titan rockets
September 1966 events
Pete Conrad
Richard F. Gordon Jr.